Martina Navratilova and Pam Shriver were the defending champions of the doubles title at the Virginia Slims of Washington tennis tournament but only Shriver competed that year with Betsy Nagelsen.

Nagelsen and Shriver won in the final 6–2, 6–3 against Larisa Savchenko and Natasha Zvereva.

Seeds
Champion seeds are indicated in bold text while text in italics indicates the round in which those seeds were eliminated.

 Betsy Nagelsen /  Pam Shriver (champions)
 Larisa Savchenko /  Natasha Zvereva (final)
 Gigi Fernández /  Robin White (semifinals)
 Katrina Adams /  Zina Garrison (semifinals)

Draw

References
 1989 Virginia Slims of Washington Doubles Draw

Virginia Slims of Washington
1989 WTA Tour